Wesley Andrew Foderingham (born 14 January 1991) is an English professional footballer who plays as a goalkeeper for EFL Championship club Sheffield United. He is a former England U19 international.

Foderingham was with Fulham and Crystal Palace as a young player, but did not make a league appearance for either club. After playing on loan for a number of non-league clubs, he signed for Swindon Town and made over 160 appearances in the Football League for the Wiltshire club. In July 2015, Foderingham signed a three-year contract with Scottish club Rangers upon being released by Swindon.

Club career

Early career
Foderingham was born in Hammersmith, Greater London. He started with Fulham in their youth squad before moving on loan to Bromley. After being released by Fulham, Foderingham signed his first professional contract with Crystal Palace in August 2010, before going on loan with Histon in March 2011.

In October 2011 he signed on loan with Swindon Town until January 2012 to cover for injured keeper Phil Smith, making his debut on 15 October 2011 against Accrington Stanley. During his time on loan in 15 games for Swindon, Foderingham conceded just six goals and kept nine clean sheets. This prompted Swindon manager Paolo Di Canio to buy the keeper for an undisclosed sum on 6 January 2012, on a contract running until July 2014.

Swindon Town

There were fears that such a record would prompt other clubs to beat Swindon Town to his signature, but Foderingham had no doubt in his mind which club he wanted to sign for. Following an abject performance against Stoke City in the League Cup, in which Swindon won 4–3, he was substituted for Leigh Bedwell in the very next game after twenty-one minutes, with Swindon two goals down. Foderingham reacted angrily to his substitution; kicking a water bottle as he left the pitch and refusing to acknowledge his manager. Manager Di Canio then publicly criticised Foderingham after the game and claimed that if he did not apologise for his actions, he would be 'out' of the club. Foderingham later issued an apology, which was accepted by Di Canio.

Foderingham was released by Swindon Town at the end of the 2014–15 season upon the expiry of his contract.

Rangers
On 3 July 2015, Foderingham signed a three-year contract with then Scottish Championship club Rangers. He made his debut for the Ibrox club in a 6–2 win against Hibernian in the first round of the Scottish Challenge Cup and was Rangers' first choice goalkeeper over Cammy Bell under new Rangers manager Mark Warburton. On 19 July 2016, Foderingham extended his contract with Rangers for another year until 2019. In July 2018, under new Manager Steven Gerrard, Foderingham became second-choice goalkeeper largely due to the return of Allan McGregor to the Rangers team after a six-year absence. Foderingham made his first appearance of the season for Rangers in a 3–1 win over Kilmarnock in the Scottish League Cup. On 19 May 2020 it was announced that he would leave Rangers at the end of May when his contract ended.

Sheffield United

Foderingham joined Premier League club Sheffield United on 17 July 2020 on a three-year contract.

International career
Foderingham has represented England at various levels including England U19s.

Personal life
He is a supporter of Newcastle United.

Career statistics

Honours
Swindon Town
Football League Two: 2011–12

Rangers
Scottish Championship: 2015–16
Scottish Challenge Cup: 2015–16

Individual
PFA Team of the Year: 2012–13 League One
Football League Two Golden Glove (Yearly): 2011–12 
Football League Two Golden Glove (Monthly): April 2012

References

External links

1991 births
Living people
Footballers from Hammersmith
English footballers
England youth international footballers
Association football goalkeepers
Fulham F.C. players
Bromley F.C. players
Crystal Palace F.C. players
Boreham Wood F.C. players
Histon F.C. players
Swindon Town F.C. players
Rangers F.C. players
National League (English football) players
English Football League players
Scottish Professional Football League players
Black British sportsmen